Northampton Airport  is a public airport located  northeast of central business district of Northampton, a city in Hampshire County, Massachusetts, USA.
Avgas fuel is self-service and is available 24 hours a day. Northampton Airport has an estimated 73 flights per day and estimated 92 based aircraft.

History 
The Northampton Airport was opened as a commercial airport on April 1, 1929. The airport was visited by the Granville brothers (who were responsible for building the Gee Bee airplane).

During World War II, the airport was used as a naval training facility and trained pilots for the war effort. The airport has been in continuous operation since its inception in 1929.

Flight school
Northampton Airport contains a flight school which consists of 15 flight instructors and 11 aircraft. The aircraft range from light sport to twin engine.  Also available for training is the Redbird Full Motion Flight Simulator.

Northampton Airport has a full service maintenance facility with Four full-time mechanics.

References

External links 

 Airport Master Record (FAA Form 5010), also available as a printable form (PDF)

Airports in Massachusetts
Buildings and structures in Northampton, Massachusetts
Transportation buildings and structures in Hampshire County, Massachusetts